The Rosewood Railway Museum is located near Rosewood, Queensland, Australia on the former railway to Marburg first opened in 1909. The museum utilises a station and yard located at Kunkala as its base.

Operations

History 
The Marburg branch opened from Rosewood in 1912 and saw primarily coal traffic for most of its life. As traffic declined the line was slowly closed in sections. Marburg to Birru was the first to close in 1964, followed by Kunkala in 1970, Cabanda in 1973 and to Perry's Knob in 1979. During the 1974 floods, the bridge carrying Rosewood-Marburg road collapsed onto the line, splitting Perry's Knob from Rosewood and cutting the line in half.

In 1984, the ARHS Queensland Division began work on returning the upper section of the line to service for the purpose of running heritage tours. The station site at Kunkala became the site of what is now the Rosewood Railway Museum.

They began running tours on both the lower and upper sections of the now split railway, opening a new station at Museum Junction in 2004.

Rolling stock 

 B. Pezet, "The Aramac Tramway Trailer Car - Aramac to Kunkula", Sunshine Express No 241, April 1986, 367-372

References

External links 
 https://www.rosewoodrailway.org.au/

Railway museums in Queensland
Railway stations in Queensland